Alex Knibbs (born 26 April 1999) is an English athlete specialising in the 400 metre hurdles.

He became British champion when winning the 400 metres event at the 2020 British Athletics Championships in a time of 46.65 secs.

References

Living people
1999 births
English male sprinters
British male sprinters
British Athletics Championships winners